NGC 5087 is an elliptical galaxy located in the constellation Virgo. It was discovered on April 8, 1788 by the astronomer William Herschel. It is a member of the NGC 5084 Group of galaxies, which is a member of the Virgo II Groups, a series of galaxies and galaxy clusters strung out from the southern edge of the Virgo Supercluster.

References

External links 
 

Elliptical galaxies
Virgo (constellation)
5087
46541